Éric Bachelart (born 28 February 1961) is a former race car driver and Conquest Racing team owner.

Racing career

Bachelart started his racing career in Belgium and ended in the United States. He was a star in Belgian Procar, a national touring car championship, driving for Audi and Peugeot.

In 1991, he became the inaugural Indy Lights champion. He then entered a near-full CART season with the tail-enders team of Dale Coyne, simultaneously racing in the Belgian Procar series. His highest CART finish was seventh. He failed to qualify for the 1993 Indianapolis 500. After the 1995 CART season, again only racing when his Belgian Procar schedule allowed it, he ended his single-seater career.

In 1996, he entered the 24 Hours of Le Mans endurance race for Belgium in a Ferrari 333SP. He also raced in the 24 Hours of Spa-Francorchamps with the Peugeot 806 multi-purpose vehicle). After this season, he concluded his racing career, with the exception of the 24 Hours of Spa-Francorchamps in 1998 and 2000.

Team ownership

Bachelart founded the Conquest Racing team in 1997, initially running in the Indy Lights championship. The team raced Laurent Rédon in the 2002 Indy Racing League (IRL). The team switched to Champ Car, after Honda and Toyota switched to the IRL. Mario Haberfeld raced for the team in 2003. Future F1 driver Tiago Monteiro raced in a satellite team ran by Conquest Racing for Emerson Fittipaldi.

England's Justin Wilson joined for 2004, ran from mid-season by Nelson Philippe. For 2005, they ran Philippe and Andrew Ranger, one of the youngest teams in the championship's history. Ranger was partnered by Dutchman Charles Zwolsman for 2006. In 2007, Bachelart signed young New Zealander Matt Halliday to his Champ Car entry for four races. Halliday was then replaced by Jan Heylen. The team moved to the IRL as a result of open-wheel unification.

In 2012, Conquest left IndyCar and joined the American Le Mans Series with a Morgan-Nissan LMP2 prototype.

In 2017, Bachelart started entering cars in Ferrari Challenge winning multiple championship with gentleman drivers.

In 2018, Bachelart co-founded Quest Racing to compete at the IMSA Continental Tire SportsCar Challenge.

In 2019, Conquest also joins the Imsa Prototype Challenge ( IPC ) and in 2021 ran a Mercedes GT4 winning the last 4 races of the season.

Racing record

Complete International Formula 3000 results
(key) (Races in bold indicate pole position) (Races
in italics indicate fastest lap)

American Open Wheel
(key)

CART

24 Hours of Le Mans results

References

External links
 
 Eric Bachelart Biography

1961 births
Belgian racing drivers
Champ Car drivers
Indianapolis 500 drivers
Indy Lights champions
Indy Lights drivers
24 Hours of Le Mans drivers
IndyCar Series team owners
Living people
International Formula 3000 drivers
Belgian expatriates in the United States
Blancpain Endurance Series drivers
24 Hours of Spa drivers
Racing drivers from Brussels
Belgian expatriate sportspeople in the United States
Dale Coyne Racing drivers
TOM'S drivers